William I. Donnermeyer Sr. (born September 19, 1924) is an American former politician, from Bellevue, Kentucky. He was elected in 1969 to the 68th district of the House of Representatives for the Commonwealth of Kentucky and was first seated in 1970.  Donnermeyer retired in 1994, having served continuously for 25 years.  Donnermeyer is a member of the Bellevue Veterans Club. He served in the US Navy during World War II.

References

External links
William I. Donnermeyer Sr. Political Graveyard
William I. Donnermeyer Sr. (photo) "Kenton County Public Library - Photographic Archives, People & Faces"
(photo) "Kenton County Public Library - Photographic Archives, People & Faces"

1924 births
Living people
People from Bellevue, Kentucky
Democratic Party members of the Kentucky House of Representatives
United States Navy personnel of World War II